José Teixeira Alves Júnior (born March 26, 1990 in São Paulo), known as Júnior Alves, is a Brazilian footballer who plays for São Caetano as defender.

Career statistics

References

External links

1990 births
Living people
Brazilian footballers
Association football defenders
Campeonato Brasileiro Série D players
Associação Desportiva São Caetano players
São Bernardo Futebol Clube players
Paulista Futebol Clube players
Mirassol Futebol Clube players
Footballers from São Paulo